Dance Pretty Lady is a 1931 British drama film directed by Anthony Asquith and starring Ann Casson, Carl Harbord, Michael Hogan, Moore Marriott and Flora Robson. It was based on the 1912 novel Carnival by Compton Mackenzie. The novel was subsequently remade as a 1946 film Carnival.

Plot
During the Edwardian era, a working-class ballet dancer begins a romance with a wealthy artist against a background of sharp disapproval.

Cast
 Ann Casson as Jenny Pearl  
 Carl Harbord as Maurice Avery 
 Michael Hogan as Castleton  
 Moore Marriott as Mr. Raeburn  
 Flora Robson as Mrs. Raeburn  
 Leonard Brett as Alf  
 Norman Claridge as Jack Danby  
 Sunday Wilshin as Irene  
 René Ray as Elsie  
 Eva Llewellyn as Aunt Mabel 
 Marie Rambert Dancers as Dancers  
 Wendy Toye as Dancer
 Alban Conway
 Hermione Gingold

References

External links

1931 films
Films directed by Anthony Asquith
Films set in the 1900s
British historical drama films
1930s historical drama films
Films set in London
British black-and-white films
1931 drama films
1930s English-language films
1930s British films